The 1999 British Formula Three season was the 49th British Formula Three Championship season. It commenced on 21 March, and ended on 17 October after sixteen races. Marc Hynes was the champion, although the season is best remembered for 19-year-old future F1 champion Jenson Button marking himself out as one to watch. Martin O'Connell took the spoils in Class B.

Drivers and teams
The following teams and drivers were competitors in the 1999 season. Class B is for older Formula Three cars.